Krishnaraja Wadiyar IV (Kannada: ನಾಲ್ವಡಿ ಕೃಷ್ಣರಾಜ ಒಡೆಯರು; 4 June 1884 – 3 August 1940) was the twenty-fourth Maharaja of Mysore, reigning from 1902 until his death in 1940.

Krishnaraja Wadiyar IV is popularly deemed a rajarshi, or 'saintly king', a moniker with which Mahatma Gandhi revered the king in 1925 for his administrative reforms and achievements. He was a philosopher king, seen by Paul Brunton as living the ideal expressed in Plato's Republic. Viscount Herbert Samuel compared him to Emperor Ashoka. Acknowledging the maharaja's noble and efficient kingship, Viscount John Sankey declared in 1930 at the first Round Table Conference in London, "Mysore is the best administered state in the world".  He is often regarded as the "father of modern Mysore" (not to be confused with the sobriquet "maker of modern Mysore", which refers to his famous prime minister Sir M. Visvesvaraya) and his reign the "golden age of Mysore". Pundit Madan Mohan Malaviya described the maharaja as "dharmic" (virtuous in conduct). John Gunther, the American author, heaped praise on the king. In an obituary, The Times called him "a ruling prince second to none in esteem and affection inspired by both his impressive administration and his attractive personality".

At the time of his death, Krishnaraja Wadiyar IV was one of the world's wealthiest men, with a personal fortune estimated in 1940 to be worth US$400 million, equivalent to $7 billion in 2018 prices. He was the second-wealthiest Indian, after Nizam Osman Ali Khan.

Early years

Krishnaraja Wadiyar IV was born on 4 June 1884 in Mysore Palace as the son of Maharaja Chamarajendra Wadiyar X and Maharani Kempananjammanni Devi. After the sudden death of his father in Calcutta in 1894, the widowed queen mother Kempananjammanni Devi ruled the state as regent from 1895 to 1902, until Krishnaraja Wadiyar reached the age of majority on 8 August 1902. Upon accession to the throne, he became the fourth king of Mysore by the name, hence known in the vernacular language Kannada as Nalwadi Krishnaraja Wadiyar (the qualifying prefix  means "the fourth").

The maharaja had his early education and training at Lokaranjan Palace in Mysore under the direction of P. Raghavendra Rao. In addition to Western studies, he was instructed in Kannada and Sanskrit. He was taught horse-riding and Indian and Western classical music. His early administrative training was imparted by Sir Stuart Fraser of the Bombay Civil Service. The study of the principles of jurisprudence and methods of revenue administration was supplemented by extensive tours of the state during which he gained immense knowledge of the nature of the country which he was later to govern.

Reign

Accession 
Shortly after the death of his father Maharaja Chamarajendra Wadiyar X on 28 December 1894, Krishnaraja Wodeyar IV, still a boy of eleven, ascended the throne on 1 February 1895. His mother Maharani Kemparajammanni Devi ruled as queen regent until Krishnaraja Wodeyar IV took over on 8 February 1902.  The yuvaraja was invested as the Maharaja of Mysore, with full ruling powers, by Marquess George Curzon, the Governor-General of India, on 8 August 1902 at a ceremony at Jaganmohana Palace.

Government 
Mysore became the first Indian state to have a representative assembly, Mysore Representative Assembly, a democratic forum in 1881. During the maharaja's reign, the assembly was enlarged and became bicameral in 1907 with the creation of the Mysore Legislative Council, a house of elders which introduced much new legislation for the state.During the maharaja's reign, the Kingdom of Mysore witnessed development in a range of fields. Mysore became the first Indian state to generate hydroelectric power in Asia, and Bangalore was the first Asian city to have street lights, first lit on 5 August 1905. Princes from other sections of India were sent to Mysore for administrative training.

Reforms 
The maharaja worked towards alleviating poverty and improving rural reconstruction, public health, industry and economic regeneration, education and the fine arts. He abolished child marriage (for girls below the age 8), gave special importance for girls' education, and offered scholarship for widowed women.

At a time when support for domestic products was pivotal for India's self-reliance and eventual independence from British India, the maharaja encouraged spinning at scale, for which Gandhi greatly praised him.

Education and arts 
Krishnaraja Wodeyar IV set up numerous educational infrastructures and institutions. Krishnaraja Wadiyar was the first chancellor of Banaras Hindu University (whose co-founder he also was) and the University of Mysore (whose founder he was). The latter was the first university chartered by an Indian province. The Indian Institute of Science at Bangalore, which was initiated during his mother's tenure as regent, functionally started during his reign in 1911 with a gift of 371 acres (1.5 km2) of land and a donation of funds.

The maharaja was a patron of Indian, both Carnatic and Hindustani, and Western classical music. He was an accomplished musician and, like his predecessors, patronised fine arts. The maharaja was a connoisseur of Carnatic and Hindustani music himself. He played eight musical instruments: flute, violin, saxophone, piano, mridangam, nadaswara, sitar, and veena.  Members of the Agra Gharana, including Nattan Khan and Ustad Vilayat Hussain Khan, were guests of the maharajah at Mysore, as were Abdul Karim Khan and Gauhar Jan. Barkatullah Khan was a palace musician from 1919 until his death in 1940.

Asthana Vidwan Kadagathur Seshacharya has written various works and is famous for his contributions towards Sanskrit and Kannada literature. The maharaja also composed many poems in Kannada himself.

Contributions

Personal life
Krishnaraja Wadiyar IV was wedded on 6 June 1900 at Jaganmohan Palace to Maharani Pratapa Kumari Devi of Kathiawar, the youngest daughter of Rana Bane Singh of Vana, Kathiawar (present-day Gujarat State). He died of heart attack on 3 August 1940. He was succeeded by his nephew Jayachamaraja Wadiyar as Maharaja.

Honours

References

Further reading 

 
 
 
 
 

Books

 

Articles

External links

1884 births
1940 deaths
Kings of Mysore
Knights Grand Commander of the Order of the Star of India
Indian Knights Grand Cross of the Order of the British Empire
Bailiffs Grand Cross of the Order of St John
Krishnaraja IV
Kannada people
20th-century Indian royalty